Antonio Lucio Vivaldi (4 March 1678 – 28 July 1741) was a Venetian composer, virtuoso violinist and impresario of Baroque music. Along with Johann Sebastian Bach and Georg Frideric Handel, Vivaldi is regarded as one of the greatest Baroque composers and his influence during his lifetime was widespread across Europe, giving origin to many imitators and admirers. He pioneered many developments in orchestration, violin technique and programmatic music. He consolidated the emerging concerto form into a widely accepted and followed idiom, which was paramount in the development of Johann Sebastian Bach's instrumental music.

Vivaldi composed many instrumental concertos, for the violin and a variety of other musical instruments, as well as sacred choral works and more than fifty operas. His best-known work is a series of violin concertos known as the Four Seasons. Many of his compositions were written for the all-female music ensemble of the Ospedale della Pietà, a home for abandoned children. Vivaldi began studying for the priesthood at the age of 15 and was ordained at 25, but was given dispensation to no longer say public Masses due to a health problem. Vivaldi also had some success with expensive stagings of his operas in Venice, Mantua and Vienna. After meeting the Emperor Charles VI, Vivaldi moved to Vienna, hoping for royal support. However, the Emperor died soon after Vivaldi's arrival, and Vivaldi himself died in poverty less than a year later.  

After almost two centuries of decline, Vivaldi's musical reputation underwent a revival in the early 20th century, with much scholarly research devoted to his work. Many of Vivaldi's compositions, once thought lost, have been rediscovered – in one case as recently as 2006. His music remains widely popular in the present day and is regularly played all over the world.

Early life

Birth and background

Antonio Lucio Vivaldi was born on 4 March 1678 in Venice, then the capital of the Republic of Venice. He was son of Giovanni Battista Vivaldi and Camilla Calicchio, as recorded in the register of San Giovanni in Bragora.

He was baptized immediately after his birth at his home by the midwife, the reason for which has led to speculation. Most likely it was done due either to his poor health or to an earthquake that supposedly struck the city that day. In the trauma of the earthquake, Vivaldi's mother may have dedicated him to the priesthood. However, there was no earthquake on the day Vivaldi was born, and this rumor may originate from an earthquake that struck Venice on April 17, 1688. The ceremonies which had been omitted were supplied two months later.

Vivaldi had five known siblings: Bonaventura Tomaso, Margarita Gabriela, Cecilia Maria, Francesco Gaetano, and Zanetta Anna. Vivaldi's health was problematic. One of his symptoms, strettezza di petto ("tightness of the chest"), has been interpreted as a form of asthma. This did not prevent him from learning to play the violin, composing, or taking part in musical activities, although it did stop him from playing wind instruments.

Youth
His father, Giovanni Battista, was a barber before becoming a professional violinist and was one of the founders of the Sovvegno dei musicisti di Santa Cecilia, an association of musicians. He taught Antonio to play the violin and then toured Venice, playing the violin with his young son. Antonio was probably taught at an early age, judging by the extensive musical knowledge he had acquired by the age of 24, when he started working at the Ospedale della Pietà.

The president of the Sovvegno was Giovanni Legrenzi, an early Baroque composer and the maestro di cappella at St Mark's Basilica. It is possible that Legrenzi gave the young Antonio his first lessons in composition. Vivaldi's father may have been a composer himself: in 1689, an opera titled La Fedeltà sfortunata was composed by a Giovanni Battista Rossi—the name under which Vivaldi's father had joined the Sovvegno di Santa Cecilia. Vivaldi's early liturgical work Laetatus sum (RV Anh 31) was written in 1691 at the age of thirteen.

In 1693, at the age of fifteen, he began studying to become a priest. He was ordained in 1703, aged 25, and was soon nicknamed il Prete Rosso, "The Red Priest" (Rosso is Italian for "red" and would have referred to the color of his hair, a family trait.).

Career

Ospedale della Pietà
While Vivaldi is most famous as a composer, he was regarded as an exceptional technical violinist as well. The German architect Johann Friedrich Armand von Uffenbach referred to Vivaldi as "the famous composer and violinist" and said that "Vivaldi played a solo accompaniment excellently, and at the conclusion he added a free fantasy [an improvised cadenza] which absolutely astounded me, for it is hardly possible that anyone has ever played, or ever will play, in such a fashion." In September 1703, Vivaldi (24) became maestro di violino (master of violin) at an orphanage called the Pio Ospedale della Pietà (Devout Hospital of Mercy) in Venice; although it was his talents as a violinist which probably secured him the job, he soon became a successful teacher of music there.

Over the next thirty years he composed most of his major works while working at the Ospedale. There were four similar institutions in Venice; their purpose was to give shelter and education to children who were abandoned or orphaned, or whose families could not support them. They were financed by funds provided by the Republic. The boys learned a trade and had to leave when they reached the age of fifteen. The girls received a musical education, and the most talented among them stayed and became members of the Ospedale's renowned orchestra and choir.

Shortly after Vivaldi's appointment, the orphans began to gain appreciation and esteem abroad, too. Vivaldi wrote concertos, cantatas and sacred vocal music for them. These sacred works, which number over 60, are varied: they included solo motets and large-scale choral works for soloists, double chorus, and orchestra. In 1704, the position of teacher of viola all'inglese was added to his duties as violin instructor. The position of maestro di coro, which was at one time filled by Vivaldi, required a lot of time and work. He had to compose an oratorio or concerto at every feast and teach the orphans both music theory and how to play certain instruments.

His relationship with the board of directors of the Ospedale was often strained. The board had to vote every year on whether to keep a teacher. The vote on Vivaldi was seldom unanimous and went 7 to 6 against him in 1709. After a year as a freelance musician, he was recalled by the Ospedale with a unanimous vote in 1711; clearly during his year's absence the board had realized the importance of his role. He became responsible for all of the musical activity of the institution when he was promoted to maestro de' concerti (music director) in 1716.

In 1705, the first collection (Connor Cassara) of his works was published by Giuseppe Sala: his Opus 1 is a collection of 12 sonatas for two violins and basso continuo, in a conventional style. In 1709, a second collection of 12 sonatas for violin and basso continuo appeared—Opus 2. A real breakthrough as a composer came with his first collection of 12 concerti for one, two, and four violins with strings, L'estro armonico (Opus 3), which was published in Amsterdam in 1711 by Estienne Roger, dedicated to Grand Prince Ferdinand of Tuscany. The prince sponsored many musicians including Alessandro Scarlatti and George Frideric Handel. He was a musician himself, and Vivaldi probably met him in Venice. L'estro armonico was a resounding success all over Europe. It was followed in 1714 by La stravaganza (Opus 4), a collection of concerti for solo violin and strings, dedicated to an old violin student of Vivaldi's, the Venetian noble Vettor Dolfin.

In February 1711, Vivaldi and his father traveled to Brescia, where his setting of the Stabat Mater (RV 621) was played as part of a religious festival. The work seems to have been written in haste: the string parts are simple, the music of the first three movements is repeated in the next three, and not all the text is set. Nevertheless, perhaps in part because of the forced essentiality of the music, the work is considered to be one of his early masterpieces.

Despite his frequent travels from 1718, the Ospedale paid him 2 sequins to write two concerti a month for the orchestra and to rehearse with them at least five times when in Venice. The orphanage's records show that he was paid for 140 concerti between 1723 and 1733.

Opera impresario

In early 18th-century Venice, opera was the most popular musical entertainment. It proved most profitable for Vivaldi. There were several theaters competing for the public's attention. Vivaldi started his career as an opera composer as a sideline: his first opera, Ottone in villa (RV 729) was performed not in Venice, but at the Garzerie Theater in Vicenza in 1713. The following year, Vivaldi became the impresario of the Teatro San Angelo in Venice, where his opera Orlando finto pazzo (RV 727) was performed. The work was not to the public's taste, and it closed after a couple of weeks, being replaced with a repeat of a different work already given the previous year.

In 1715, he presented Nerone fatto Cesare (RV 724, now lost), with music by seven different composers, of which he was the leader. The opera contained eleven arias and was a success. In the late season, Vivaldi planned to put on an opera entirely of his own creation, Arsilda, regina di Ponto (RV 700), but the state censor blocked the performance. The main character, Arsilda, falls in love with another woman, Lisea, who is pretending to be a man. Vivaldi got the censor to accept the opera the following year, and it was a resounding success.

During this period, the Pietà commissioned several liturgical works. The most important were two oratorios. Moyses Deus Pharaonis, (RV 643) is now lost. The second, Juditha triumphans (RV 644), celebrates the victory of the Republic of Venice against the Turks and the recapture of the island of Corfu. Composed in 1716, it is one of his sacred masterpieces. All eleven singing parts were performed by girls of the orphanage, both the female and male roles. Many of the arias include parts for solo instruments—recorders, oboes, violas d'amore, and mandolins—that showcased the range of talents of the girls.

Also in 1716, Vivaldi wrote and produced two more operas, L'incoronazione di Dario (RV 719) and La costanza trionfante degli amori e degli odi (RV 706). The latter was so popular that it was performed two years later, re-edited and retitled Artabano re dei Parti (RV 701, now lost). It was also performed in Prague in 1732. In the years that followed, Vivaldi wrote several operas that were performed all over Italy.

His progressive operatic style caused him some trouble with more conservative musicians such as Benedetto Marcello, a magistrate and amateur musician who wrote a pamphlet denouncing Vivaldi and his operas. The pamphlet, Il teatro alla moda, attacks the composer even as it does not mention him directly. The cover drawing shows a boat (the Sant'Angelo), on the left end of which stands a little angel wearing a priest's hat and playing the violin. The Marcello family claimed ownership of the Teatro Sant'Angelo, and a long legal battle had been fought with the management for its restitution, without success. The obscure text under the engraving mentions non-existent places and names: for example, ALDIVIVA is an anagram of "A. Vivaldi".

In a letter written by Vivaldi to his patron Marchese Bentivoglio in 1737, he makes reference to his "94 operas". Only around 50 operas by Vivaldi have been discovered, and no other documentation of the remaining operas exists. Although Vivaldi may have been exaggerating, it is plausible that, in his dual role of composer and impresario, he may have either written or been responsible for the production of as many as 94 operas—given that his career had by then spanned almost 25 years. While Vivaldi certainly composed many operas in his time, he never attained the prominence of other great composers such as Alessandro Scarlatti, Johann Adolph Hasse, Leonardo Leo, and Baldassare Galuppi, as evidenced by his inability to keep a production running for an extended period of time in any major opera house.

Mantua and the Four Seasons

In 1717 or 1718, Vivaldi was offered a prestigious new position as Maestro di Cappella of the court of prince Philip of Hesse-Darmstadt, governor of Mantua, in the northwest of Italy He moved there for three years and produced several operas, among them Tito Manlio (RV 738). In 1721, he was in Milan, where he presented the pastoral drama La Silvia (RV 734); nine arias from it survive. He visited Milan again the following year with the oratorio L'adorazione delli tre re magi al bambino Gesù (RV 645, now lost). In 1722 he moved to Rome, where he introduced his operas' new style. The new pope Benedict XIII invited Vivaldi to play for him. In 1725, Vivaldi returned to Venice, where he produced four operas in the same year.

During this period Vivaldi wrote the Four Seasons, four violin concertos that give musical expression to the seasons of the year. The composition was probably one of his most famous. Though three of the concerti are wholly original, the first, "Spring", borrows motifs from a Sinfonia in the first act of Vivaldi's contemporaneous opera Il Giustino. The inspiration for the concertos was probably the countryside around Mantua. They were a revolution in musical conception: in them Vivaldi represented flowing creeks, singing birds (of different species, each specifically characterized), barking dogs, buzzing mosquitoes, crying shepherds, storms, drunken dancers, silent nights, hunting parties from both the hunters' and the prey's point of view, frozen landscapes, ice-skating children, and warming winter fires. Each concerto is associated with a sonnet, possibly by Vivaldi, describing the scenes depicted in the music. They were published as the first four concertos in a collection of twelve, Il cimento dell'armonia e dell'inventione, Opus 8, published in Amsterdam by Michel-Charles Le Cène in 1725.

During his time in Mantua, Vivaldi became acquainted with an aspiring young singer Anna Tessieri Girò, who would become his student, protégée, and favorite prima donna. Anna, along with her older half-sister Paolina, moved in with Vivaldi and regularly accompanied him on his many travels. There was speculation as to the nature of Vivaldi's and Girò's relationship, but no evidence exists to indicate anything beyond friendship and professional collaboration. Vivaldi, in fact, adamantly denied any romantic relationship with Girò in a letter to his patron Bentivoglio dated 16 November 1737.

Late period
At the height of his career, Vivaldi received commissions from European nobility and royalty, some of them are:

 The serenata (cantata) Gloria e Imeneo (RV 687), was commissioned in 1725 by the French ambassador to Venice in celebration of the marriage of Louis XV, when Vivaldi was 48 years old.

 The serenata, La Sena festeggiante (RV 694), was written in 1726 for and premiered at the French embassy as well, celebrating the birth of the French royal princesses, Henriette and Louise Élisabeth. 

 Vivaldi's Opus 9, La cetra, was dedicated to Emperor Charles VI. In 1728, Vivaldi met the emperor while the emperor was visiting Trieste to oversee the construction of a new port. 

Charles VI admired the music of the Red Priest so much that he is said to have spoken more with the composer during their one meeting than he spoke to his ministers in over two years. He gave Vivaldi the title of knight, a gold medal and an invitation to Vienna. Vivaldi gave Charles a manuscript copy of La cetra, a set of concerti almost completely different from the set of the same title published as Opus 9. The printing was probably delayed, forcing Vivaldi to gather an improvised collection for the emperor.

 His opera Farnace (RV 711) was presented in 1730; it garnered six revivals. Some of his later operas were created in collaboration with two of Italy's major writers of the time.  Vivaldi was accompanied by his father and traveled to Vienna and Prague in 1730. 

 L'Olimpiade and Catone in Utica were written by Pietro Metastasio, the major representative of the Arcadian movement and court poet in Vienna. La Griselda was rewritten by the young Carlo Goldoni from an earlier libretto by Apostolo Zeno.

Like many composers of the time, Vivaldi faced financial difficulties in his later years. His compositions were no longer held in such high esteem as they once had been in Venice; changing musical tastes quickly made them outmoded. In response, Vivaldi chose to sell off sizeable numbers of his manuscripts at paltry prices to finance his migration to Vienna. The reasons for Vivaldi's departure from Venice are unclear, but it seems likely that, after the success of his meeting with Emperor Charles VI, he wished to take up the position of a composer in the imperial court. On his way to Vienna, Vivaldi may have stopped in Graz to see Anna Girò.

Death

Vivaldi moved to Vienna probably to stage operas, especially as he took up residence near the Kärntnertortheater. Shortly after his arrival in Vienna, Charles VI died, which left the composer without any royal protection or a steady source of income. Soon afterwards, Vivaldi became impoverished and died during the night of 27/28 July 1741, aged 63, of "internal infection", in a house owned by the widow of a Viennese saddlemaker. 

On 28 July, Vivaldi was buried in a simple grave in a burial ground that was owned by the public hospital fund. His funeral took place at St. Stephen's Cathedral. Contrary to popular legend, the young Joseph Haydn who was in the cathedral choir at the time had nothing to do with his burial, since no music was performed on that occasion. The cost of his funeral with a 'Kleingeläut' was 19 Gulden 45 Kreuzer which was rather expensive for the lowest class of peal of bells.

Vivaldi was buried next to the Karlskirche, a baroque church in an area which is now part of the site of the TU Wien university. The house where he lived in Vienna has since been destroyed; the Hotel Sacher is built on part of the site. Memorial plaques have been placed at both locations, as well as a Vivaldi "star" in the Viennese Musikmeile and a monument at the Rooseveltplatz.

Only two, possibly three, original portraits of Vivaldi are known to survive: an engraving, an ink sketch and an oil painting. The engraving, which was the basis of several copies produced later by other artists, was made in 1725 by François Morellon de La Cave for the first edition of Il cimento dell'armonia e dell'inventione, and shows Vivaldi holding a sheet of music. The ink sketch, a caricature, was done by Ghezzi in 1723 and shows Vivaldi's head and shoulders in profile. It exists in two versions: a first jotting kept at the Vatican Library, and a much lesser-known, slightly more detailed copy recently discovered in Moscow. The oil painting, which can be seen in the International Museum and Library of Music of Bologna, is anonymous and is thought to depict Vivaldi due to its strong resemblance to the La Cave engraving.

During his lifetime, Vivaldi was popular in many countries throughout Europe, including France, but after his death his popularity dwindled. After the end of the Baroque period, Vivaldi's published concerti became relatively unknown, and were largely ignored. Even his most famous work, The Four Seasons, was unknown in its original edition during the Classical and Romantic periods. Vivaldi's work was rediscovered in the 20th century.

Works

A composition by Vivaldi is identified by RV number, which refers to its place in the "Ryom-Verzeichnis" or "Répertoire des oeuvres d'Antonio Vivaldi", a catalog created in the 20th century by the musicologist Peter Ryom.

Le quattro stagioni (The Four Seasons) of 1723 is his most famous work. Part of Il cimento dell'armonia e dell'inventione ("The Contest between Harmony and Invention"), it depicts moods and scenes from each of the four seasons. This work has been described as an outstanding instance of pre-19th-century program music.

Vivaldi wrote more than 500 other concertos. About 350 of these are for solo instrument and strings, of which 230 are for violin, the others being for bassoon, cello, oboe, flute, viola d'amore, recorder, lute, or mandolin. About forty concertos are for two instruments and strings, and about thirty are for three or more instruments and strings.

As well as about 46 operas, Vivaldi composed a large body of sacred choral music, such as the Magnificat RV 610. Other works include sinfonias, about 90 sonatas and chamber music.

Some sonatas for flute, published as Il Pastor Fido, have been erroneously attributed to Vivaldi, but were composed by Nicolas Chédeville.

Catalogues of Vivaldi works

Vivaldi's works attracted cataloging efforts befitting a major composer. Scholarly work intended to increase the accuracy and variety of Vivaldi performances also supported new discoveries which made old catalogs incomplete. Works still in circulation today may be numbered under several different systems (some earlier catalogs are mentioned here).

Because the simply consecutive Complete Edition (CE) numbers did not reflect the individual works (Opus numbers) into which compositions were grouped, numbers assigned by Antonio Fanna were often used in conjunction with CE numbers. Combined Complete Edition (CE)/Fanna numbering was especially common in the work of Italian groups driving the mid-20th-century revival of Vivaldi, such as Gli Accademici di Milano under Piero Santi. For example, the Bassoon Concerto in B major, "La Notte" RV 501, became CE 12, F. VIII,1

Despite the awkwardness of having to overlay Fanna numbers onto the Complete Edition number for meaningful grouping of Vivaldi's oeuvre, these numbers displaced the older Pincherle numbers as the (re-)discovery of more manuscripts had rendered older catalogs obsolete.

This cataloging work was led by the Istituto Italiano Antonio Vivaldi, where Gian Francesco Malipiero was both the director and the editor of the published scores (Edizioni G. Ricordi). His work built on that of Antonio Fanna, a Venetian businessman and the Institute's founder, and thus formed a bridge to the scholarly catalog dominant today.

Compositions by Vivaldi are identified today by RV number, the number assigned by Danish musicologist Peter Ryom in works published mostly in the 1970s, such as the "Ryom-Verzeichnis" or "Répertoire des oeuvres d'Antonio Vivaldi". Like the Complete Edition before it, the RV does not typically assign its single, consecutive numbers to "adjacent" works that occupy one of the composer's single opus numbers. Its goal as a modern catalog is to index the manuscripts and sources that establish the existence and nature of all known works.

Style and influence
Vivaldi's music was innovative. He brightened the formal and rhythmic structure of the concerto, in which he looked for harmonic contrasts and innovative melodies and themes.

The German scholar Walter Kolneder has discerned the influence of Legrenzi's style in Vivaldi's early liturgical work Laetatus sum (RV Anh 31), written in 1691 at the age of thirteen.

Johann Sebastian Bach was deeply influenced by Vivaldi's concertos and arias (recalled in his St John Passion, St Matthew Passion, and cantatas). Bach transcribed six of Vivaldi's concerti for solo keyboard, three for organ, and one for four harpsichords, strings, and basso continuo (BWV 1065) based upon the concerto for four violins, two violas, cello, and basso continuo (RV 580).

Legacy

In the early 20th century, Fritz Kreisler's Concerto in C, in the Style of Vivaldi (which he passed off as an original Vivaldi work) helped revive Vivaldi's reputation. Kreisler's concerto in C spurred the French scholar Marc Pincherle to begin an academic study of Vivaldi's oeuvre. Many Vivaldi manuscripts were rediscovered, which were acquired by the Turin National University Library as a result of the generous sponsorship of Turinese businessmen Roberto Foa and Filippo Giordano, in memory of their sons. This led to a renewed interest in Vivaldi by, among others, Mario Rinaldi, Alfredo Casella, Ezra Pound, Olga Rudge, Desmond Chute, Arturo Toscanini, Arnold Schering and Louis Kaufman, all of whom were instrumental in the revival of Vivaldi throughout the 20th century.

In 1926, in a monastery in Piedmont, researchers discovered fourteen bound volumes of Vivaldi's work that were previously thought to have been lost during the Napoleonic Wars. Some missing tomes in the numbered set were discovered in the collections of the descendants of the Grand Duke Durazzo, who had acquired the monastery complex in the 18th century. The volumes contained 300 concertos, 19 operas and over 100 vocal-instrumental works.

The resurrection of Vivaldi's unpublished works in the 20th century greatly benefited from the noted efforts of Alfredo Casella, who in 1939 organized the historic Vivaldi Week, in which the rediscovered Gloria (RV 589) and l'Olimpiade were revived. Since World War II, Vivaldi's compositions have enjoyed wide success. Historically informed performances, often on "original instruments", have increased Vivaldi's fame still further.

Recent rediscoveries of works by Vivaldi include two psalm settings of Nisi Dominus (RV 803, in eight movements) and Dixit Dominus (RV 807, in eleven movements). These were identified in 2003 and 2005, respectively, by the Australian scholar Janice Stockigt. The Vivaldi scholar Michael Talbot described RV 807 as "arguably the best nonoperatic work from Vivaldi's pen to come to light since […] the 1920s". Vivaldi's 1730 opera Argippo (RV 697), which had been considered lost, was rediscovered in 2006 by the harpsichordist and conductor Ondřej Macek, whose Hofmusici orchestra performed the work at Prague Castle on 3 May 2008—its first performance since 1730.

Modern depictions of Vivaldi's life include a 2005 radio play, commissioned by the ABC Radio National and written by Sean Riley. Entitled The Angel and the Red Priest, the play was later adapted for the stage and was performed at the Adelaide Festival of the Arts.

Notes

References

Bibliography

Further reading
 Romijn, André. Hidden Harmonies: The Secret Life of Antonio Vivaldi, 2007 
 Selfridge-Field, Eleanor (1994). Venetian Instrumental Music, from Gabrieli to Vivaldi. New York, Dover Publications. .

External links
 
 
 
 
 

 
1678 births
1741 deaths
18th-century male musicians
18th-century Italian Roman Catholic priests
Catholic liturgical composers
Composers for cello
Composers for violin
Italian Baroque composers
Italian classical violinists
Italian expatriates in Austria
Italian male classical composers
Italian opera composers
Republic of Venice clergy
Male classical violinists
Male opera composers
Oratorio composers
Musicians from Venice
18th-century Italian composers
Impresarios